Alexander Kulitz (born August 12, 1981 in Tübingen) is a German politician and member of the Bundestag. He is a lawyer, and a member of the Free Democratic Party.

References

External links
 

1981 births
People from Tübingen
Living people
Members of the Bundestag for Baden-Württemberg
Members of the Bundestag 2017–2021
Members of the Bundestag for the Free Democratic Party (Germany)